Alexander Chocke may refer to:
 Alexander Chocke of Avington (by 1566–1607), English politician who represented the Parliamentary constituency of Westbury from 1605 to 1607
 Alexander Chocke of Shalbourne (1594–1625), English politician who represented the Parliamentary constituency of Ludgershall from 1621 to 1622